Eupithecia chesiata is a moth in the family Geometridae. It is found in China (Xinjiang).

References

Moths described in 1904
chesiata
Moths of Asia